Mazeras is a township in Coast Province, Kenya, approximately  north-west of Mombasa. Mazeras is located between Mariakani and Miritini along Nairobi Mombasa highway.

There is a famous botanical garden in Mazeras called Mazeras Mauwani where most people visit to take glamorous photos mostly during holidays.

Sandstone 

Mazeras is known for its sandstone, part of the Duruma series – an extremity of the topology forming the Shimba Hills National Reserve. Known in Swahili as Maji-Ya Chumvi (literally "saltwater"  – due to the settlement's proximity to the Indian Ocean), the sandstone is from the Late Triassic period and its heat resisting properties mean it is suitable for a wide range of building purposes.

Transport 
Mazeras is on the Uganda Railway's main line between Mombasa and Nairobi. South of the settlement is the Mazeras Spiral, one of the original four railway spirals built on the railway to navigate steep inclines.

References 

Populated places in Coast Province
Mombasa